Max Elbaum is an American author and left-wing activist. He has written extensively about the New Left, Civil Rights Movement and anti-war movement.  His book on the "new communist movement” of the 1970s and 1980s, Revolution in the Air: Sixties Radicals turn to Lenin, Mao and Che,  was praised by historian David Garrow as "an absolutely first-rate work of political scholarship".

He was a member of Students for a Democratic Society and later a founder of Line of March.

References

External links 
 Revolution in The Air By Max Elbaum (archived March 2016)

21st-century American historians
American male non-fiction writers
American social activists
Year of birth missing (living people)
Living people
American Marxists
American historians
American Maoists